{{Infobox book
| name          = A Hymn Before Battle
| title_orig    =
| translator    =
| image         = File:Ringo hymm before battle.jpg
| caption       = Paperback cover
| author        = John Ringo
| illustrator   =
| cover_artist  =
| country       = United States
| language      = English
| series        = Legacy of the Aldenata
| genre         = Military science fiction
| publisher     = Baen Books
| release_date  = 2000
| english_release_date =
| media_type    = Hardcover & paperback
| pages         = 467 pp
| isbn =  978-0-671-31841-3
| preceded_by   =
| followed_by   = Gust Front (2001)
}}A Hymn Before Battle is the first book in John Ringo's Legacy of the Aldenata'' series. Earth is introduced to extraterrestrial life by the Galactics, who tell the leaders of the World that an invasion by another alien race, the Posleen, is coming. Earth's military forces are made available to the Galactics in exchange for technology to help stop the onslaught, but it is unclear just who can be trusted as the invasion nears.

Title
The title recalls Rudyard Kipling's poem "Hymn Before Action", which is quoted extensively throughout the book.

Major characters
 Bob Duncan, Staff Sergeant, Chief Fire Direction Controller for the 2nd Battalion 325th Infantry Heavy Mortar section
 Jack Horner, Lieutenant General, commander Joint Special Operations Command
 Jacob "Jake the Snake" Mosovich, Command Sergeant Major Special Forces
 David Mueller, Sergeant First Class, Special Forces
 Michael O'Neal, Web designer and former Sergeant.  Recalled to develop technology and tactics to deal with the alien threat.
 Sharon O'Neal, wife of Michael and former Naval Officer.
 Earnest Pappas, Master Gunnery Sergeant USMC (Ret.)
 Himmit Rigas, representative of his race to humans
 Jimmy Stewart, PFC Fleet Strike and former gang member
 Tulo’stenaloor, First Order Battlemaster of the Sten Po’oslena’ar.

Reviews
Library journal praised the "fast-paced action and acid humor".  Booklist praised it as "splendid if somewhat sprawling, but added "Critics may not give it the time of day".

References

Novels by John Ringo
Legacy of the Aldenata
2000 American novels